"Fraudcast News" is the twenty-second and final episode of the fifteenth season of the American animated television series The Simpsons. It originally aired on the Fox network in the United States on May 23, 2004. Episode writer Don Payne, won the Writers Guild of America's Paul Selvin Award, which honors works that focus on First Amendment issues, for his work on the episode.

Plot
Springfield holds a ceremony dedicating their newest national park, Geezer Rock, a rock formation which resembles the face of an old man in profile. As Lisa Simpson prepares to read a poem there at the behest of Mayor Quimby, Homer notices that there is a small tree growing in the eye of the rock. Fearing that it will destroy Geezer Rock over time, he rushes over and pulls it out. This causes Geezer Rock to fall apart, and everyone runs for their lives — except for Mr. Burns, who winds up in a landslide. Smithers is fearful he has lost Mr. Burns.

Lisa is saddened that no one ever heard her poem, and she publishes it on Marge's suggestion. Meanwhile, it turns out that Burns survived the horrible landslide through slithering his way out and subsisting on centipedes, insects and mole milk. However, Springfield's local news instead reports on the destruction of Geezer Rock and then labels Mr. Burns as being a hateful man nobody liked.

Lisa distributes the very first issue of her newspaper, The Red Dress Press, which is well received. She enlists the help of Bart, Milhouse Van Houten, Martin Prince, Nelson Muntz, and Ralph Wiggum among others, to publish her newspaper's second issue. Meanwhile, to improve his image after the landslide, Burns acquires all media outlets in Springfield except Lisa's newspaper. He even makes an episode of The Itchy & Scratchy Show promoting nuclear power. Later, Burns tries to bait Lisa with ponies in an attempt to acquire her newspaper, but she will not give up. Lisa is saddened that all the others employees of the newspaper left her, but is relieved when Bart decides to stay and help Lisa publish more issues.

Burns gets back at Lisa by cutting off the Simpsons' power, so Lisa is forced to write her next issue through an old mimeograph that Principal Skinner used in Vietnam. Mr. Burns finally wins the war by interrogating Homer with a truth serum so he can damage Lisa's reputation; the following day's Springfield Shopper boasts the headline, "LISA’S A TOTAL WACKO, IMPLIES FATHER", and goes further by humiliating Milhouse's crush upon her. Lisa writes her final "I Give Up" edition and shuts down the Red Dress Press. Homer responds by creating his own newspaper, The Homer Times, with which he defends Lisa and her journalistic integrity, while many of the townspeople, inspired by Homer, also create their own newspapers to voice their individual opinions. Burns realizes that, while he succeeded in defeating Lisa and her journal, he cannot possibly buy out everyone nor stop people criticizing him. As a result, he is forced to acknowledge that no one besides Rupert Murdoch can truly control the whole media. Then, he goes out on a shopping spree with Smithers for relief.

Reception

In its original airing, this episode was watched by 9.2 million viewers.

In addition to winning the Paul Selvin Award, Don Payne was also nominated for a Writers Guild of America Award for Outstanding Writing in Animation at the 57th Writers Guild of America Awards for his script to this episode.

References

External links 
 

The Simpsons (season 15) episodes
Fictional mass media owners
2004 American television episodes
Concentration of media ownership
Television episodes about censorship